The Church of Christ in Indonesia, Gereja Kristus, is a Reformed denomination in Indonesia. Its mission began in the 19th century as a work among Chinese immigrants. In conjunction with  Dutch immigrants, small congregations began to develop in cities throughout Java. In 1905, the Episcopal Methodist Church also started working in Java. The denomination was officially formed in 1939 and included 17 congregations and approximately 18,000 members, predominantly from West and East Java in addition to Southern Sumatra and Jakarta.

References 

Reformed denominations in Asia